Errol Dunkley (born 6 February 1951), sometimes spelled Erroll Dunkley, is a Jamaican reggae musician, born in Kingston, Jamaica in 1951.

Biography
Dunkley's recording career began in 1965, when he was 14, with "Gypsy" (a duet with Roy Shirley) for Linden Pottinger's Gaydisc label, "My Queen" (with Junior English) for Prince Buster, and "Love Me Forever" on the Rio label. From 1967 to 1968, he recorded several singles for Joe Gibbs, including "Please Stop Your Lying" (1967) and "Love Brother" (1968), before switching to Coxsone Dodd in 1969. 

In the early 1970s, with Gregory Isaacs, he formed the African Museum record label. Isaacs soon took sole control of the label, and Dunkley formed Silver Ring, a new label. In 1972, he teamed up with producer Jimmy Radway for two of his most popular singles, "Keep the Pressure Down" and "Black Cinderella". The same year saw the release of Dunkley's debut album, Presenting Errol Dunkley, produced by Sonia Pottinger, which included the track "A Little Way Different".

Dunkley continued to record throughout the 1970s and toward the end of the decade his popularity in the UK grew, resulting in a breakthrough UK Singles Chart hit in 1979 with "OK Fred", a cover version of a song written by John Holt, that reached number 11. His 1980 release "Sit Down And Cry" also reached the charts.

Dunkley re-recorded "OK Fred", his biggest hit, in 1996 with Queen Sister *N*.

Albums
Presenting Errol Dunkley (Gay Feet, 1972), reissued as Darling Ooh (Trojan Records, 1981) – (a four star AMG recommendation)
Sit and Cry Over You (Third World, 1976)
Militant Man (Lovella International, 1980)
Profile of Errol Dunkley aka OK Fred (Third World, 1980)
In a Different, Different Style (Easy Street Records, 1984)
Special Request (Carousel, 1987)
Aquarius (1989)
The Early Years (Rhino, 1995)
Please Stop Your Lying (early Joe Gibbs recordings) (Rocky One, 1996)
Continually (2000)
OK Fred (The Best Of) (Trojan 2004)
Love Is Amazing (Studio One)
Moodie Meets Errol Dunkley (Moodie Music)
OK Fred - Storybook Revisited -  Errol Dunkley (Burning Sounds ) 2020

See also
List of reggae musicians
List of performers on Top of the Pops

References

External links

Reggae and Dancehall Artist Information – mini biography and discography
Discogs website discography

Jamaican reggae musicians
1951 births
Living people
Musicians from Kingston, Jamaica